Basuri Tjahaja Purnama (born ) is an Indonesian politician, who served as Regent of East Belitung from 2010 to 2015. He is the younger brother of Basuki Tjahaja Purnama, who served as East Belitung regent from 2005-2006 and later Deputy Governor (2012-2014) and Governor (2014-2017) of Jakarta.

Political career 
Purnama was elected as regent in the 2010 East Belitung regent election. He was defeated in the 2015 election by Yuslih Ihza Mahendra of the Crescent Star Party.

References 

Hakka people
University of Indonesia alumni
Indonesian physicians
Indonesian people of Chinese descent
Indonesian politicians of Chinese descent
21st-century Indonesian politicians
1967 births
Living people